Cardinal Gibbons High School may refer to:

 Cardinal Gibbons High School (Fort Lauderdale, Florida)
 Cardinal Gibbons High School (Raleigh, North Carolina)
 Cardinal Gibbons School (Baltimore, Maryland)